Yury Vladimirovich Pertsukh (born 13 May 1996) is a Kazakh footballer who plays for Aktobe on loan from FC Astana, and the Kazakhstan national football team.

Career

Club
On 24 November 2017, FC Astana announced the signing of Pertsukh.

On 28 July 2018, Pertsukh joined Atyrau on loan for the remainder of the 2018 season.

Career statistics

Club

International

Statistics accurate as of match played 13 October 2019

International goals
Scores and results list Kazakhstan's goal tally first.

References

External links

Living people
1996 births
Kazakhstani footballers
Association football forwards
Kazakhstan international footballers
Kazakhstan Premier League players
FC Bayterek players
FC Kyzylzhar players
FC Akzhayik players
FC Astana players
FC Atyrau players
FC Aktobe players